Alicia Endemann (born 15 December 1988, Hamburg) is a German actress, beauty queen and model. She represented Germany in Miss Universe 2012.

Endemann, whose parents are both actors, Jocelyne Boisseau and Gernot Endemann, has also taken up acting. She starred in 364 episodes of the Nickelodeon television series, Das Haus Anubis, as Luzy Rosaline Schoppa between 2009 and 2012. In 2013, she starred in the television drama Danni Lowinski, as a German lawyer, Claudia.  In 2016, she starred in French movie as Annika in Ma famille t'adore déjà

She speaks five languages and has studied Marketing and Management at college in Antwerp, Belgium.

References

External links
 
 

1988 births
German female models
Living people
German beauty pageant winners
Miss Universe 2012 contestants
German people of French descent